Nikola Mojsilović (born 3 November 1991) is a Serbian footballer who last played for FK Inđija.

Honours
Radnik Surdulica
Serbian First League: 2014–15

References

External links
 

1991 births
Living people
Footballers from Belgrade
Association football forwards
Serbian footballers
FK Radnički Obrenovac players
FK Zemun players
FK Jagodina players
FK Vojvodina players
FK Radnik Surdulica players
OFK Bačka players
Serbian First League players
Serbian SuperLiga players